Justice T. Paramasiva Iyer (1863–1943) was an Indian vedic scholar, writer and a District and Sessions Judge of Bangalore during the period of Maharaja Chamarajendra Wadiyar X and later went on to become the Chief Justice of the Mysore High Court. He was the father of reputed Kannada poet T.P. Kailasam. He had expert knowledge in various physical sciences viz. Geology, Mining, Organic Chemistry, Agriculture, Astronomy. He was well versed in classical Greek and Latin literature and made comparative studies in Vedic Philology. He was a student of Lord Baron Avebury.

Books
 The Riks or Primeval Gleams of Light And Life

References

Scholars from Bangalore
Indian Vedic scholars
Judges of the Karnataka High Court
20th-century Indian judges
1863 births
1943 deaths
19th-century Indian judges